Nik Novecento (19 February 1964 – 15 October 1987) was an Italian actor and television personality.

Life and career 
Born in Bologna as Leonardo Sottani, Novecento's career was launched by film director Pupi Avati, who discovered Novecento when he was working at a gas station; Novecento starred in six Avati's films between 1983 and 1987. Aside from his film career, Novecento gained some popularity as regular opinionist of Maurizio Costanzo Show and as television host of the Avati's TV-show Hamburger Serenade, broadcast by RaiUno in 1986. In October 1987, at 23, he suddenly died of a heart attack while he was in Rome at Avati's studios.

Filmography

References

External links 
 

Italian male film actors
1964 births
Actors from Bologna
1987 deaths
Italian television presenters
20th-century Italian male actors